Braniff International Airways Flight 542, a Lockheed L-188 Electra, registration N9705C, was a scheduled domestic flight from Houston, Texas, bound for New York with scheduled stops in Dallas and Washington, D.C. On September 29, 1959, 23 minutes into the 41-minute flight from Houston to Dallas Love Field, the aircraft disintegrated in mid-air approximately  southeast of Buffalo, Texas, killing everyone on board.

Identifying the cause of the disaster proved difficult, as the accident had occurred before the age of flight data recorders. The Civil Aeronautics Board (CAB) investigated the accident and, after interviewing numerous eyewitnesses and examining the debris field, were able to conclude that the initial failure of the aircraft had begun in the left wing. However, even though it was determined that the wing was destroyed by "cycles of reverse bending" or "flutter", the investigation failed to determine how the flutter was caused, and the investigation stalled.

In the six months following the accident further progress towards identifying the cause of the flutter was unsuccessful and the case remained unsolved. The breakthrough into unlocking the cause of the accident came after the crash of Northwest Airlines Flight 710 on March 17, 1960. This aircraft, another Electra, had disintegrated in mid-air after losing its wings in a similar fashion to the Braniff aircraft. The investigation into the Northwest crash discovered a new phenomenon of harmonic coupling within the wings of aircraft, which in the end was ultimately identified by the CAB as being the cause of both break-ups. The final accident report for Flight 542 was issued on April 28, 1961.

Aircraft and crew history 
Flight 542 was a Lockheed L-188 Electra equipped with four Allison 501-D13 engines. The plane was eleven days old, having come off Lockheed's California manufacturing line on September 18, 1959, and had only 132 hours of flight time. All six crew members – two pilots, a flight engineer and three flight attendants – had little experience with the Electra, having only recently completed their transition training.

Accident 
Flight 542 was originally scheduled to depart Houston for Dallas at 22:15 Central Standard Time (CST) but departed the ramp at 22:37, 22 minutes late.  The delay was due to a minor mechanical discrepancy with the number three generator.  The plane was given clearance for takeoff at 22:40 and the crew reported they were airborne by 22:44.

At 23:09, as the aircraft was on course to the Trinidad Intersection, the left wing and number one (left outboard) engine separated from the aircraft.  Pieces of the wing, blown back by the wind–blast, struck and dislodged the horizontal stabilizer.  The right wing's planking then broke away and the number four (right outboard) engine tore away.  The right wing outboard of the number four engine broke away as well, causing structural damage to the fuselage and triggering the breakup of the aircraft.

One of the passengers was George Uffner, a New York organized crime figure and former associate of Arnold Rothstein, Charles Luciano and Frank Costello. In the wreckage there were found loose diamonds valued at $200,000 and another undamaged case of diamonds. It was speculated that the diamonds belonged to Uffner.

Investigation 

Civil Aeronautics Board investigators arrived on the scene the morning following the accident. The left wing was found a mile away from the potato field in which most of the other pieces of aircraft lay, and the pieces of the right wing were scattered in a widespread debris field across the countryside.

Investigation determined that the break-up of the plane had begun in the left wing and progressed in a catastrophic sequence which ultimately destroyed the aircraft. However, the reason for the disintegration of the left wing proved to be elusive. Tests found that "flutter" had destroyed the wing, however the Electra's wings were supposedly flutter-free. Further tests attempting to re-create the accident by weakening the wing and exposing it to loads greater than any which would conceivably have occurred in the actual flight failed to cause a break-up similar to the one that occurred in Flight 542. Help from teams at Boeing, Convair, National Aeronautics and Space Administration (NASA) and the Federal Aviation Administration (FAA) also failed to determine how Lockheed's "flutter-free" wing had simply ripped away during flight, and the investigation stalled, further progress not being achieved for nearly six months.

Renewal of interest in finding the cause for the Braniff Flight 542 crash occurred after Northwest Orient Airlines Flight 710, another Electra model aircraft of the same kind as Flight 542, disintegrated in-flight and crashed near Tell City, Indiana, on March 17, 1960. Following the second crash, CAB Chief Safety Investigator Phillip Goldstein was reported as saying: "The structure was subjected to forces greater than it was designed for. We have definite evidence of a wing failure. Why this wing failure occurred, I don't know."

Initial investigations into the second crash proved fruitless but after laborious testing investigators were able to find flaws in the aircraft which included an overly stiff wing, and outboard nacelles responding differently than intended in the design briefs. Further experimentation discovered that flutter in a nacelle can be passed on to even a "flutter-free" wing. Final work in the mystery also found that as the magnitude of the flutter grows, the frequency at which it vibrates decreases. In the case of the two Electra crashes the frequency of the flutter had lowered from five cycles per second to three, the same as the natural frequency of the wing, creating harmonic coupling. This harmonic coupling would have continued to cause ever larger wing vibrations until some part of the structure failed. Contributing to the two aircraft's demise was the stiffness of the wings and severe clear-air turbulence. Final analysis of the CAB, in its official Accident Report:

Conclusion

There was in this investigation no positive indication of the cause. For this reason, an attempt has been made in this report to eliminate certain possibilities by application of the available evidence to each of them. Once these possibilities have been disposed of, the only remaining causal factor for which there is some known basis is the condition of whirl mode. The probability that this accident was so caused is supported by the following.

1. So far as is known, the aircraft was in straight and level flight and at a normal cruise speed with no serious mechanical problems.

2. A sound identified as a supersonic or high speed propeller occurred 30 seconds prior to fuel ignition (wing failure).

3. There was structural damage evidence compatible with oscillatory motion of the No. 1 QEC and the left wing.

4. First stage compressor blades of No. 1 engine rubbed the air inlet housing supports.

5. The probable cause of a similar accident of another Electra was due to whirl mode.

If prior damage is a requirement for the necessary reduction in stiffness, it must be assumed that the evidence of such damage was either obliterated in the crash or never existed in a discernible form.

Probable Cause

The Board determines that the probable cause of this accident was structural failure of the left wing resulting from forces generated by undampened propeller whirl mode.

The final reports into the two accidents were released four days apart, on April 24 and April 28, 1961, respectively, with the Braniff crash report being the later of the two. The two reports were similar and blamed the same forces for destroying both aircraft.

See also
List of accidents and incidents involving commercial aircraft

References

External links 
 CAB Aircraft Accident Report on Braniff Flight 542

Aviation accidents and incidents in the United States in 1959
1959 in Texas
542
Airliner accidents and incidents in Texas
Airliner accidents and incidents caused by in-flight structural failure
Accidents and incidents involving the Lockheed L-188 Electra
Leon County, Texas